Lusch is a German surname. Notable people with the surname include:

Christian Lusch (born 1981), German sport shooter
Michael Lusch (born 1964), German footballer and manager
Robert Lusch (born 1949), American academic

See also
Busch (surname)

German-language surnames